Jah Victory is a 2007 reggae album by the Ivorian artist Alpha Blondy.

Track listing

Personnel
Alpha Blondy – lead vocals
Robbie Shakespeare - bass guitar
Sly Dunbar - drums

References

2007 albums
Alpha Blondy albums